In February 1999, three clashes occurred between the aviation of Ethiopia and Eritrea. The events were part of the Badme War.

During the clashes on February 21, 25 and 26, Ethiopian Su-27s fought against Eritrean MiG-29s. There is a possibility that pilots from the former USSR participated in the battles. In all three skirmishes, the Ethiopians won. As a result of the events, the Ethiopian aviation gained complete air supremacy. The aerial victory helped to raise morale. After February 1999, Eritrea avoided direct combat with enemy aircraft and did not commit air attacks.

It is noteworthy that earlier MiG and Sukhoi aircraft did not meet in battles as opponents. This was the first such case.

Literature 
 Михаил Жирохов. Война в воздухе на Африканском Роге // Уголок неба : авиационная энциклопедия. — 2004.
 А. Иванович. Эфиопия — Эритрея : Уроки воздушной войны // Авиация и время : журнал. — 2009. — № 4. — стр. 40—46.

References 

Eritrean–Ethiopian border conflict
February 1999 events in Africa
1999 in Eritrea
1999 in Ethiopia